Buffalo is a city in Leon County, Texas, United States. The population was 1,767 at the 2020 census.

Geography

Buffalo is located at  (31.461402, –96.063024).

Demographics

As of the 2020 United States census, there were 1,767 people, 744 households, and 423 families residing in the city.

At the 2000 census there were 1,804 people in 668 households, including 474 families, in the city. The population density was 448.7 people per square mile (173.3/km). There were 815 housing units at an average density of 202.7 per square mile (78.3/km).  The racial makeup of the city was 71.40% White, 14.80% African American, 0.06% Native American, 0.55% Asian, 11.59% from other races, and 1.61% from two or more races. Hispanic or Latino of any race were 17.02%.

Of the 668 households 37.6% had children under the age of 18 living with them, 47.5% were married couples living together, 18.4% had a female householder with no husband present, and 28.9% were non-families. 25.9% of households were one person and 12.0% were one person aged 65 or older. The average household size was 2.63 and the average family size was 3.16.

The age distribution was 29.8% under the age of 18, 10.5% from 18 to 24, 25.0% from 25 to 44, 21.1% from 45 to 64, and 13.6% 65 or older. The median age was 33 years. For every 100 females, there were 89.5 males. For every 100 females age 18 and over, there were 83.6 males.

The median household income was $25,625 and the median family income  was $31,058. Males had a median income of $28,807 versus $17,083 for females. The per capita income for the city was $14,246. About 21.1% of families and 23.5% of the population were below the poverty line, including 31.3% of those under age 18 and 21.9% of those age 65 or over.

Education
The City of Buffalo is served by the Buffalo Independent School District.

Notable People

 Tom Araya, lead singer and bassist of Slayer 
 Seth McKinney, former offensive lineman for the Buffalo Bills
 Steve McKinney, former offensive lineman for the Houston Texans, brother of Seth McKinney

1959 plane crash 
Braniff Flight 542 crashed in Buffalo on September 29, 1959. It was en route to Dallas from Houston, and the crash resulted in the deaths of twenty-nine passengers and five crew members. The plane was an 11-day-old Lockheed L-188 Electra. The Civil Aeronautics Board blamed the crash on an "whirl-mode" prop theory.

Climate
The climate in this area is characterized by hot, humid summers and generally mild to cool winters.  According to the Köppen Climate Classification system, Buffalo has a humid subtropical climate, abbreviated "Cfa" on climate maps.

References

External links

 
 Buffalo Chamber of Commerce
 The Buffalo Press
 Buffalo, Texas on gendisasters.com

Cities in Texas
Cities in Leon County, Texas